Gehyra papuana, also known as the Papua four-clawed gecko or Papua dtella, is a species of gecko endemic to New Guinea. It occurs in both Papua New Guinea and Western New Guinea (Indonesia).

References

Gehyra
Endemic fauna of New Guinea
Reptiles of Papua New Guinea
Reptiles of Western New Guinea
Reptiles described in 1874
Taxa named by Adolf Bernhard Meyer
Geckos of New Guinea